Regi Penxten (born Reginald Paul Stefan Penxten on 4 March 1976) is a Belgian DJ and record producer of many Eurodance and trance projects in Belgium, including Milk Inc. and Sylver.

Better known by his mononym Regi, he has released three solo albums, which all reached the top ten of the Belgian album charts: Best Of (2005), Registrated (2007) and Registrated 2 (2010). Regi also had a number of charting singles in the Belgian Ultratop charts and two charting in the Netherlands.

Career 
At the end of 2007, he released his first solo-album, REGIstrated, which received a golden record before its release. The first produced was the song "Turn the Tide" in 2000.

As one of the main members of Milk Inc., he has had a further 27 hit singles in the Ultratop, 22 of them inside the top ten, with four number 1 singles. Their seven albums also all charted, with Forever and Nomansland reaching number 1.

As producer and co-songwriter of Sylver, he has had a further 22 charting hits, including 10 top ten hits, one of which reached the number 1 spot. 5 of the 6 charting albums also reached the top 10, with the 2010 compilation topping the charts. They have so far sold more than 1.5 million CDs.

Discography 
(For discography with Milk Inc., see their page)
(For discography of Sylver that Regi Penxten produced, see their page)

Albums 

Live albums

Mixtapes 
2005: Regi in the Mix 1
2006: Regi in the Mix 2
2006: Regi in the Mix 3
2007: Regi in the Mix 4
2007: Registrated: The Jump Remixes
2008: Regi in the Mix 5
2008: Regi in the Mix 6
2009: Regi in the Mix 7
2009: Regi in the Mix 8
2010: Regi in the Mix 9
2011: Regi in the Mix 10
2011: Regi in the Mix 11
2012: Regi in the Mix 12
2012: Regi in the Mix 13
2013: Regi in the Mix 14
2014: Regi in the Mix 15
2014: Regi in the Mix Ultimate

Singles

Featured in

Other charted songs

Filmography 

 De Slimste Mens ter Wereld (2008) – as himself
 F.C. De Kampioenen (2011) – as himself
 Familie (2011) – as himself
 The Voice van Vlaanderen (2014) – coach
 Tegen de sterren op (2014) – as himself
 The Voice Kids (2014) – coach
 D5R: de film (2017) – as himself
 Liefde voor muziek (2020) – participant
 De Zomer van (2020) – as himself

References

External links 
Regi Penxten
Regi Penxten at discogs.com

1976 births
Living people
Belgian DJs
Belgian record producers
Eurodance musicians
People from Hasselt
Electronic dance music DJs